Cholota is a village in Sughd Region, northern Tajikistan. It is part of the Mastchoh District.

References

Populated places in Sughd Region